Ringland may refer to:

Ringland, Newport, Wales
Ringland, Norfolk, England
Arthur Cuming Ringland (born 1882), Conservationist and co-founder of CARE
Trevor Ringland (born 1959), solicitor and former Rugby Union winger for Northern Ireland
Ringland (organisation), an environmental movement in Antwerp, Belgium